McAslan is a surname. Notable people with the surname include:

John McAslan (born 1954), Scottish architect
Kirsten McAslan (born 1993), British sprinter
Sean McAslan (born 1980), Canadian ice hockey player